"Dice" is a song recorded by South Korean girl group Nmixx for their second single album Entwurf. It was released as the single album's lead single by JYP Entertainment on September 19, 2022.

Background and release
On August 22, 2022, JYP Entertainment announced Nmixx would be releasing their second single album Entwurf on September 19. On August 31, the track listing for Entwurf was released with "Dice" announced as the lead single. The music video teaser was released on September 16 and 17. On September 18, the highlight medley teaser video was released. The song was released alongside its music video and the single album on September 19.

Composition
"Dice" was written by Dr. Jo, Charin, Zaya, and Park Ji-hyun from 153/Joombas, Myung Hye-in (Jam Factory), and Baek Sae-im from Jam Factory, and Danke from Lalala Studio. The song was composed and arranged by Armadillo and Rangga alongside Frankie Day, and Charlotte Wilson from The Hub, The Hub 88, and Jonkind for the composition. It was described as a pop song with elements of jazz, trap, and hip hop, with lyrics about "the narrative of a mysterious adversary who appears in the dice game with the Nmixx as [the adversary] opponent". "Dice" was composed in the key of G major, with a tempo of 131 beats per minute.

Promotion
Following the release of Entwurf, the group held a live event titled "New Frontier: Entwurf" on the same day, to introduce the single album and its songs including "Dice". They subsequently performed four music programs: Mnet's M Countdown on September 22, KBS's Music Bank on September 23, MBC's Show! Music Core on September 24, and SBS's Inkigayo on September 25.

Credits and personnel
Credits adapted from Melon.

Studios
 JYPE Studios – recording
 Chapel Swing Studios – mixing
 821 Sound Mastering – mastering
 Ingrid studio – vocal editing

Personnel

 Nmixx – vocals
 Ejae – background vocals
 Dr. Jo (153/Joombas) – lyrics, vocal directing
 Charin (153/Joombas) – lyrics
 Zaya (153/Joombas) – lyrics
 Park Ji-hyun (153/Joombas) – lyrics
 Myung Hye-in (Jam Factory) – lyrics
 Baek Sae-im (Jam Factory) – lyrics
 Danke (Lalala Studio) – lyrics
 Armadillo – composition, arrangement, various instruments, vocal directing, 
 Rangga – composition, arrangement
 Frankie Day (The Hub) – composition
 Charlotte Wilson (The Hub) – composition, vocal directing
 The Hub 88 – composition
 Jonkind – composition
 Jason Lee – alto saxophone, tenor saxophone, baritone saxophone
 Jeong Sang-su – trumpet
 Chu Myung-ho – trombone
 Um Se-hee – recording
 Tony Maserati – mixing
 David K. Younghyun – mixing
 Kwon Nam-woo – mastering
 Brian U – vocal directing
 Jeong Eun-kyung – vocal editing

Charts

Weekly charts

Monthly charts

Release history

References

Nmixx songs
2022 songs
2022 singles
Korean-language songs
JYP Entertainment singles